Oruru-Parapara is a statistical area on the southern side of Doubtless Bay in Northland, New Zealand.  runs across the northern part. It includes the localities of Aurere, Parapara, Paranui and Oruru. The small settlements of Taipa-Mangonui are north and northeast of the area and are not included in it.

The Oruru Valley was the location of many pā sites and is of archaeological and cultural importance. The valley had two part-time schools in 1879 A school continued to flourish at Oruru in 1947, and there was also a school at Parapara at that time.

Te Aurere, a recreation of the waka used by Polynesians to settle New Zealand, was built and launched at Aurere.  The Kupe Waka Centre is a tourist attraction under construction at Aurere. It will provide education and training for traditional Māori waka construction.

Demographics

Oruru-Parapara had a population of 846 at the 2018 New Zealand census, an increase of 159 people (23.1%) since the 2013 census, and an increase of 156 people (22.6%) since the 2006 census. There were 285 households, comprising 426 males and 420 females, giving a sex ratio of 1.01 males per female. The median age was 46.8 years (compared with 37.4 years nationally), with 165 people (19.5%) aged under 15 years, 126 (14.9%) aged 15 to 29, 420 (49.6%) aged 30 to 64, and 135 (16.0%) aged 65 or older.

Ethnicities were 73.8% European/Pākehā, 41.5% Māori, 3.9% Pacific peoples, 2.1% Asian, and 2.8% other ethnicities. People may identify with more than one ethnicity.

The percentage of people born overseas was 11.3, compared with 27.1% nationally.

Of those people who chose to answer the census's question about religious affiliation, 44.3% had no religion, 40.8% were Christian, 1.4% had Māori religious beliefs, 0.4% were Buddhist and 1.4% had other religions.

Of those at least 15 years old, 87 (12.8%) people had a bachelor or higher degree, and 165 (24.2%) people had no formal qualifications. The median income was $20,100, compared with $31,800 nationally. 48 people (7.0%) earned over $70,000 compared to 17.2% nationally. The employment status of those at least 15 was that 240 (35.2%) people were employed full-time, 123 (18.1%) were part-time, and 39 (5.7%) were unemployed.

See also
Oruru River

Notes

Far North District
Populated places in the Northland Region